Armed Response is a 1986 action thriller film directed by Fred Olen Ray and starring David Carradine and Lee Van Cleef. It is the first action film made by CineTel Films and distributed by Metro Goldwyn Mayer.

Plot 
One of the men of a dangerous Yakuza boss known as Akira Tanaka has subtracted a statuette that he had planned to use as a peace offering between the local Yakuza and a rival Chinese tong. It seems that two private investigators were hired for the exchange of bailout money to restore the statue, but their business plan to recover the statue gets worse and Clay Roth is killed. This infuriates the Roth brothers and their father, as all three of them happen to be veterans, as they go off to find the person responsible and get their revenge as well.

Cast 
David Carradine as Jim Roth   
Lee Van Cleef as Burt Roth 
Mako as Akira Tanaka
Lois Hamilton as Sara Roth  
Brent Huff as Tommy Roth  
Ross Hagen as Cory Thorton  
Dick Miller as Steve  
Burr DeBenning as Lt. Sanderson
Michael Berryman as F.C.

References

External links
 

1980s English-language films
1986 films
1986 action thriller films
1980s crime thriller films
American action thriller films
American crime thriller films
CineTel Films films
Films directed by Fred Olen Ray
Yakuza films
1980s American films
1980s Japanese films